Songs for the Daily Planet is the 1994 debut album of American alternative country artist Todd Snider. It was released in 1994 via MCA Records.

Content 
The album contains 12 songs, all written or co-written by Snider. "Talkin' Seattle Grunge Rock Blues", a hidden track on the album, was a minor radio hit.

Mark Chesnutt covered "Trouble" on his 1995 album Wings, and Gary Allan covered "Alright Guy" on his 2001 album Alright Guy, both of which were also produced by Tony Brown.

Critical reception

Jack Leaver of Allmusic wrote that it was "A rootsy record that combines country and folk elements with a genuine rock & roll sensibility", rating the album 4.5 out of 5 stars. Dan Kening of the Chicago Tribune rated it 3.5 out of 4 stars, comparing Snider's sound to Billy Joe Shaver and Steve Earle while noting "deft lyrical insights" on songs such as "This Land Is Our Land" and "You Think You Know Somebody". Rating it "A−", Bob Cannon of Entertainment Weekly compared Snider's sound to R&B music and Bruce Springsteen, while noting that "You Think You Know Somebody" was "movingthe last thing you'd expect from a wiseass."

Track listing
All songs written by Todd Snider except where noted.

"My Generation (Part 2)" - 3:09
"Easy Money" - 5:16
"That Was Me" - 3:15
"This Land Is Our Land" - 4:31
"Alright Guy" - 4:30
"I Spoke as a Child" - 4:16
"Turn It Up" - 4:31
"Trouble" - 3:42
"Alot More" - 4:52
"You Think You Know Somebody" - 4:26
"Somebody's Coming" (Snider, Mark Marchetti, Shannon Hills) - 4:05
"Joe's Blues" (Snider, Joe Mariencheck) - 8:43
includes hidden track "Talkin' Seattle Grunge Rock Blues"

Personnel
Compiled from liner notes.
Musicians
Marshall Chapman - background vocals
Ashley Cleveland - background vocals
Peter Hyrka - violin, mandolin, acoustic guitar, squeeze box, finger snaps
Doug Lancio - additional electric guitar on "This Land Is Our Land"
Tom Littlefield - background vocals
Mark "Hoot" Marchetti - finger snaps, vibraphone
Joe Mariencheck - bass guitar, finger snaps, background vocals
Joe McLeary - drums
Terry McMillan - percussion
Edgar Meyer - double bass
Eddy Shaver - electric guitar
Todd Snider - vocals, acoustic guitar, harmonica
Harry Stinson - background vocals
Michael Utley - piano, organ

Technical
Chuck Ainlay - overdubbing
Tony Brown - production
Jim Demain - overdubbing
Richard Dodd - overdubbing, mixing
Lee Groitzsch - recording
Steve Hall - mastering
Roger Nichols - recording, overdubbing
Steven B. Schnoor - engineering
Brian Tankersley - recording
John Thomas II - engineering
Michael Utley - production

References

1994 debut albums
Todd Snider albums
MCA Records albums
Albums produced by Tony Brown (record producer)
Albums produced by Michael Utley